William Blan (2 May 1922 – 13 April 2008) was an English professional rugby league footballer who played in the 1940s and 1950s.

Background
Blan's birth was registered in Wigan district, Lancashire, England, he was the younger brother of the rugby league footballer Jack Blan, and the older brother of the rugby league footballer Albert Blan, he died aged 85–86 in Wigan, Greater Manchester, leaving behind his wife; Pat, and five children.

Playing career

International honours
Billy Blan won caps for England while at Wigan in 1951 against Wales, and France, in 1952 against Other Nationalities, and won caps for Great Britain while at Wigan in 1951 against New Zealand (3 matches).

Challenge Cup Final appearances
Billy Blan played right-, i.e. number 12, in Wigan's 8-3 victory over Bradford Northern in the 1947–48 Challenge Cup Final during the 1947–48 season at Wembley Stadium, London on Saturday 1 May 1948, in front of a crowd of 91,465.

County Cup Final appearances
Billy Blan played right-, i.e. number 12, and scored a try in Wigan's the 9-3 victory over Belle Vue Rangers in the 1946–47 Lancashire County Cup Final during the 1946–47 season at Station Road, Swinton on Saturday 26 October 1946, played right- in the 10-7 victory over Belle Vue Rangers in the 1947–48 Lancashire County Cup Final during the 1947–48 season at Wilderspool Stadium, Warrington on Saturday 1 November 1947, played right- in the 14-8 victory over Warrington in the 1948–49 Lancashire County Cup Final during the 1948–49 season at Station Road, Swinton on Saturday 13 November 1948, played  and scored a try in the 20-7 victory over Leigh in the 1949–50 Lancashire County Cup Final during the 1949–50 season at Wilderspool Stadium, Warrington on Saturday 29 October 1949, and played  in the 28-5 victory over Warrington in the 1950–51 Lancashire County Cup Final during the 1950–51 season at Station Road, Swinton on Saturday 4 November 1950.

Club career
Billy Blan joined Wigan from the Royal Air Force straight after World War II, and won a Championship medal in his first season. In his Wigan career he won two Challenge Cup Winners medals, three Championship medals, and five Lancashire County Cup winners medals. Billy Blan made his début for Leeds against Hunslet in the Lazenby Cup at Headingley on Monday 10 August 1953.

Honoured at Wigan
Billy Blan was a life member at Wigan.

After playing
After Billy Blan finished his playing career, he worked as Wigan's Lottery Manager in Pools Office.

Note
The Civil Registration index gives William Blan's district of birth as being Barnsley, whereas other sources state Wigan.

References

External links
Saints Heritage Society profile
Statistics at wigan.rlfans.com
(archived by web.archive.org) Britain hold out Kiwis at Odsal
(archived by web.archive.org) Profile at wiganwarriors.com

1922 births
2008 deaths
England national rugby league team players
English rugby league players
Great Britain national rugby league team players
Lancashire rugby league team players
Leeds Rhinos players
Royal Air Force personnel of World War II
Rochdale Hornets players
Rugby league players from Wigan
Rugby league locks
Rugby league second-rows
St Helens R.F.C. players
Wigan Warriors players